Tranceport 2 is a mix album released by Dave Ralph in 1999. It was released on Kinetic Records.

Track listing

Disc 1 - Departures
Sasha - Rabbitweed
Jam & Spoon - Stella (Nalin & Kane Mix)
Airtight - Sealed
Luke Slater - Love (12" Mix)
Tea Freaks - Arms Of Orion
Medway - The Baseline Track
Resistance D - Feel So High
Sasha - Belfunk
Andy Ling - Fixation

Disc 2 - Arrivals
Christian Smith & John Selway - Move!
Art of Trance - Madagascar (Ferry Corsten Mix)
Oliver Lieb - Subraumstimulation (John Johnson Mix)
X-Cabs - Infectious (Evolution Mix)
Fragma - Toca Me
DJ Eyal - Dreamcatcher (Tea Freaks Milk & Two Sugars Mix)
TR Junior - Rock With Me
Atlantis - Fiji
DJ Tandu - Velvet

References

External links

1999 compilation albums
Techno compilation albums
DJ mix albums
Kinetic Records compilation albums